Biri is a village in Szabolcs-Szatmár-Bereg county, in the Northern Great Plain region of eastern Hungary. Its postal code is 2836

Geography
The region of Biri is especially famous for its large number of ice-cream parlors.

References

Biri